Tkalec Manor ( or ) is a baroque building situated next to the village of Štrigova in Međimurje County, northern Croatia.

It was built in the mid-18th century and first owned by the members of the Pauline Catholic Order in Štrigova, until their order was abolished by the Croato-Hungarian king Joseph II of Habsburg in 1786. In the 19th century it was owned by the counts of Zichy, who had estates in the neighbouring Slovenian region of Prekmurje as well. Before the national independence of Croatia, it was run until 1990 by a local peasants' agricultural cooperative society. After that it was privatized.

The manor itself has a long porch with arcades in the southeastern side. There is a large cellar inside with an old and huge wooden wine press from 1858. It was used for the wine production based on the widespread vineyards on the surrounding hills of that area.

Gallery

See also
 List of castles in Croatia
 Zichy

Buildings and structures in Međimurje County
Castles in Croatia
History of Međimurje